Grall is a surname. Notable people with the surname include:

Erin Grall (born 1977), American politician
Michel Grall (born 1961), French politician
Xavier Grall (1930–1981), French journalist and poet
Erik Grall (born 1988), American narcotics trafficker

See also
Groll
Rall